Kalighat is a station of the Kolkata Metro, located on Shyama Prasad Mukherjee Road at Rashbehari More, Kalighat.

Construction

The station

Structure
Kalighat is underground metro station, situated on the Kolkata Metro Line 1 of Kolkata Metro.

Station layout

Connections

Tram
Tram route number 24/29 serves the station.

See also

Kolkata
List of Kolkata Metro stations
Transport in Kolkata
Kolkata Metro Rail Corporation
Kolkata Suburban Railway
Kolkata Monorail
Trams in Kolkata
Tollygunge
E.M. Bypass
List of rapid transit systems
List of metro systems

References

External links
 
 Official Website for line 1
 UrbanRail.Net – descriptions of all metro systems in the world, each with a schematic map showing all stations.

Kolkata Metro stations
Railway stations in Kolkata